Charinus is a genus of amblypygids of the family Charinidae.

Species
, there are 107 species in this genus.

 Charinus abbatei Delle Cave, 1986
 Charinus acaraje Pinto-da-Rocha, Machado & Weygoldt, 2002
 Charinus acosta (Quintero, 1983)
 Charinus africanus Hansen, 1921
 Charinus aguayoi Moyá-Guzmán, 2009
 Charinus alagoanus Miranda, Giupponi, Prendini & Scharff, 2021
 Charinus apiaca Miranda, Giupponi, Prendini & Scharff, 2021
 Charinus asturius Pinto-da-Rocha, Machado & Weygoldt, 2002
 Charinus australianus (L. Koch, 1867)
 Charinus belizensis Miranda, Giupponi & Wizen, 2016
 Charinus bengalensis (Gravely, 1911)
 Charinus bichuetteae Giupponi & Miranda, 2016
 Charinus bonaldoi Giupponi & Miranda, 2016
 Charinus bordoni (Ravelo, 1975)
 Charinus brasilianus Weygoldt, 1972
 Charinus brescoviti Giupponi & Miranda, 2016
 Charinus bromeliaea Joque & Giupponi, 2012
 Charinus bruneti Teruel & Questel, 2011
 Charinus camachoi (González-Sponga, 1998)
 Charinus carajas Giupponi & Miranda, 2016
 Charinus caribensis (Quintero, 1986)
 Charinus carinae Miranda, Giupponi, Prendini & Scharff, 2021
 Charinus carioca Miranda, Giupponi, Prendini & Scharff, 2021
 Charinus carvalhoi Miranda, Giupponi, Prendini & Scharff, 2021
 Charinus cavernicolus Weygoldt, 2006
 Charinus cearensis Miranda, Giupponi, Prendini & Scharff, 2021
 Charinus centralis Armas & Ávila Calvo, 2000
 Charinus cubensis (Quintero, 1983)
 Charinus decu (Quintero, 1983)
 Charinus dhofarensis Weygoldt, Pohl & Polak, 2002
 Charinus diamantinus Miranda, Giupponi, Prendini & Scharff, 2021
 Charinus dominicanus Armas & González, 2002
 Charinus eleonorae Baptista & Giupponi, 2003
 Charinus elegans Weygoldt, 2006
 Charinus euclidesi Miranda, Giupponi, Prendini & Scharff, 2021
 Charinus fagei Weygoldt, 1972
 Charinus gertschi Goodnight & Goodnight, 1946
 Charinus goitaca Miranda, Giupponi, Prendini & Scharff, 2021
 Charinus guayaquil Miranda, Giupponi, Prendini & Scharff, 2021
 Charinus guto Giupponi & Miranda, 2016
 Charinus imperialis Miranda, Giupponi, Prendini & Scharff, 2021
 Charinus insularis Banks, 1902
 Charinus ioanniticus (Kritscher, 1959)
 Charinus jibaossu Vasconcelos, Giupponi & Ferreira, 2014
 Charinus koepckei Weygoldt, 1972
 Charinus loko Miranda, Giupponi, Prendini & Scharff, 2021
 Charinus longipes Weygoldt, 2006
 Charinus madagascariensis Fage, 1954
 Charinus magalhaesi Miranda, Giupponi, Prendini & Scharff, 2021
 Charinus milloti Fage, 1939
 Charinus miskito Miranda, Giupponi, Prendini & Scharff, 2021
 Charinus mocoa Miranda, Giupponi, Prendini & Scharff, 2021
 Charinus monasticus Miranda, Giupponi, Prendini & Scharff, 2021
 Charinus montanus Weygoldt, 1972
 Charinus muchmorei Armas & Teruel, 1997
 Charinus mysticus Giupponi & Kury, 2002
 Charinus neocaledonicus Simon, 1895
 Charinus omanensis Delle Cave, Gardner & Weygoldt, 2009
 Charinus orientalis Giupponi & Miranda, 2016
 Charinus pakistanus Weygoldt, 2005
 Charinus palikur Miranda, Giupponi, Prendini & Scharff, 2021
 Charinus papuanus Weygoldt, 2006
 Charinus pardillalensis (González-Sponga, 1998)
 Charinus pecki Weygoldt, 2006
 Charinus perezassoi Armas, 2010
 Charinus perquerens Miranda, Giupponi, Prendini & Scharff, 2021
 Charinus pescotti Dunn, 1949
 Charinus platnicki (Quintero, 1986)
 Charinus potiguar Vasconcelos, Giupponi & Ferreira, 2013
 Charinus puri Miranda, Giupponi, Prendini & Scharff, 2021
 Charinus quinteroi Weygoldt, 2002
 Charinus reddelli Miranda, Giupponi & Wizen, 2016
 Charinus renneri Miranda, Giupponi & Wizen, 2016
 Charinus schirchii (Mello-Leitão, 1931)
 Charinus seychellarum Kraepelin, 1898
 Charinus sillami Réveillion & Maquart, 2015
 Charinus socotranus Weygoldt, Pohl & Polak, 2002
 Charinus sooretama Miranda, Giupponi, Prendini & Scharff, 2021
 Charinus souzai Miranda, Giupponi, Prendini & Scharff, 2021
 Charinus stygochthobius Weygoldt & Van Damme, 2004
 Charinus susuwa MMiranda, Giupponi, Prendini & Scharff, 2021
 Charinus taboa Vasconcelos, Giupponi & Ferreira, 2016
 Charinus tomasmicheli Armas, 2007
 Charinus troglobius Baptista & Giupponi, 2002
 Charinus tronchonii (Ravelo, 1975)
 Charinus ruschii Miranda, Giupponi & Wizen, 2016
 Charinus una Miranda, Giupponi, Prendini & Scharff, 2021
 Charinus vulgaris Miranda & Giupponi, 2011
 Charinus wanlessi Simon, 1892

References 

Amblypygi
Arachnid genera